The Gaon Digital Chart is a chart that ranks the best-performing singles in South Korea. Managed by the domestic Ministry of Culture, Sports and Tourism (MCST), its data is compiled by the Korea Music Content Industry Association and published by the Gaon Music Chart. The ranking is based collectively on each single's download sales, stream count, and background music use. In mid-2008, the Recording Industry Association of Korea ceased publishing music sales data. The MCST established a process to collect music sales in 2009, and began publishing its data with the introduction of the Gaon Music Chart the following February. With the creation of the Gaon Digital Chart, digital data for individual songs was provided in the country for the first time. Gaon provides weekly (listed from Sunday to Saturday), monthly and yearly charts. Below is a list of singles that topped the weekly and monthly charts.

Weekly charts

Monthly charts

References

External links
  Current Gaon Digital Chart

2020 singles
Korea, South singles
2020 in South Korean music